Baba Aman Rural District is a rural district (dehestan) in the Central District of Bojnord County, North Khorasan Province, Iran. At the 2006 census, its population was 19,323, in 4,540 families.  The rural district has 16 villages.

References 

Rural Districts of North Khorasan Province
Bojnord County